

In probability theory, a tree diagram may be used to represent a probability space.

Tree diagrams may represent a series of independent events (such as a set of coin flips) or conditional probabilities (such as drawing cards from a deck, without replacing the cards).  Each node on the diagram represents an event and is associated with the probability of that event. The root node represents the certain event and therefore has probability 1. Each set of sibling nodes represents an exclusive and exhaustive partition of the parent event.

The probability associated with a node is the chance of that event occurring after the parent event occurs. The probability that the series of events leading to a particular node will occur is equal to the product of that node and its parents' probabilities.

See also
Decision tree
Markov chain

Notes

References
Charles Henry Brase, Corrinne Pellillo Brase: Understanding Basic Statistics. Cengage Learning, 2012, pp. 205–208 (online copy at Google)

External links

tree diagrams - examples and applications
Tree Diagrams

Experiment (probability theory)